Enrico Lucchin (born 4 April 1995) is an Italian professional rugby union player who primarily plays centre for Zebre Parma of the United Rugby Championship.

Professional career 
Lucchin has previously played for clubs such as Mogliano, Rovigo, and Calvisano in the past.

In 2015, Lucchin was named in the Italy Under 20 squad and in 2016 and 2017 he was named in the Emerging Italy squad. On the 14 October 2021, he was selected by Alessandro Troncon to be part of an Italy A 28-man squad for the 2021 end-of-year rugby union internationals.
On 10th October 2022 he was selected by Kieran Crowley to be part of an Italy 33-man squad for the 2022 November Internationals matches against He made his debut against Samoa .

References

External links 

1995 births
Living people
Italian rugby union players
Rugby union centres
Mogliano Rugby players
Rugby Rovigo Delta players
Rugby Calvisano players
Zebre Parma players
Italy international rugby union players
People from Adria